Memoirs of the Actor in a Supporting Role is a 1982 play by Bahram Beyzai.

Plot 
The play recounts the urban adventures of two male villagers (named Mowhebat and Zolfaqar) in Tehran during the earlier stages of street demonstrations in the 1979 revolution. Driven by drought and indigence, the two arrive in the large city in the latter months of the shah's rule in order to seek employment. They end up as hirelings in large crowds of mercenary vagabonds demonstrating against revolutionaries. Each day they dress up as workers, party members, students, parents of demonstrating students protesting against their own rebellious children, etc. Their unwittingly reactionary occupation in troubled times adds up to catastrophic consequences.

Text 
The play was written in 1982 and first published in the spring of 1983 by Damavand Publishing House; which has been its only licensed publication in Persian. In 2010 it was published in the United States in Mohammad Reza Ghanoonparvar's English translation.

Performance 
The play has never been directed and produced by the playwright. Yet, other notable performances include the 2003 autumn production in Tehran directed by Hadi Marzban with a cast of 42 and with Farzaneh Kaboli in one of the leading roles.

In Other Languages 
The play was translated into English by M.R. Ghanoonparvar and published in 2010 in the United States:

 Memoirs of the Actor in a Supporting Role:  A Play by Bahram Beyzai (2010)

References

External links 
 Beyzai, Bahram. Memoirs of the Actor in a Supporting Role: A Play. translated with an introduction and bibliography by M. R. Ghanoonparvar. Costa Mesa, CA: Mazda Publishers, Inc. 2010. 
 «خاطرات هنرپیشه نقش دوم» مجله بخارا . مهر - دی ۱۳۸۹ - شماره ۷۷ و ۷۸ (صفحه از ۶۵۶ تا ۶۵۷)|Noor Specialized Magazines Website
 

Plays by Bahram Beyzai
1982 plays
1983 plays
2010 books
Plays set in Iran
Books about Iran
Iran in fiction
Tehran in fiction
Iranian literature
Persian-language books
Iranian books
Fiction set in the 1970s
Fiction set in 1979
Political plays
Period pieces
Plays set in the 1970s
Plays based on actual events
Books about the Iranian Revolution